The 2001–02 Cypriot Third Division was the 31st season of the Cypriot third-level football league. SEK Agiou Athanasiou won their 1st title.

Format
Fourteen teams participated in the 2001–02 Cypriot Third Division. All teams played against each other twice, once at their home and once away. The team with the most points at the end of the season crowned champions. The first three teams were promoted to the 2002–03 Cypriot Second Division and the last three teams were relegated to the 2002–03 Cypriot Fourth Division.

Point system
Teams received three points for a win, one point for a draw and zero points for a loss.

Changes from previous season
Teams promoted to 2001–02 Cypriot Second Division
 ASIL Lysi
 Adonis Idaliou
 Enosis Kokkinotrimithia

Teams relegated from 2000–01 Cypriot Second Division
 Kinyras Empas
 Rotsidis Mammari
 AEK/Achilleas Ayiou Theraponta

Teams promoted from 2000–01 Cypriot Fourth Division
 Sourouklis Troullon
 PEFO Olympiakos
 ATE PEK Ergaton

Teams relegated to 2001–02 Cypriot Fourth Division
 Ethnikos Latsion FC
 AMEP Parekklisia
 THOI Avgorou

League standings

Results

See also
 Cypriot Third Division
 2001–02 Cypriot First Division
 2001–02 Cypriot Cup

Sources

Cypriot Third Division seasons
Cyprus
2001–02 in Cypriot football